Siraha (Nepali:) is the headquarters and municipality of Siraha District, a part of Madhesh Province , Nepal. Siraha had a population of 28,442 according to the census of 2011. and a population of 82,531 as of 2015.The current population of Siraha municipality as of census 2022, is 96,543.It has a male population of 47,306 and female population of 49,237. The present mayor of Siraha Municipality is Dr. Nabin Kumar Yadav and Deputy Mayor is Babita Kumari Sah.Both assumed office on 25 May 2022. His predecessor  mayor was Asheswor Yadav and the deputy mayor was Dr. Namita Yadav. Both assumed office on 25 September 2017 and their last working day was on 24 May 2022.  The town is at  altitude,  ESE of Janakpur.

Siraha municipality
Siraha municipality is in Siraha district of Madhesh Province. It is one of the old municipalities among 58 municipalities. When dividing Nepal into 34 districts, Siraha was in Saptadi district. Siraha municipality was established in 2053 (BS) composed of 5 VDCs namely Siraha, Maknaha, Manpur, Basbitta and Thangi, which was divided into 9 wards. Ward numbers 1, 2, 7, and 8 were made from Maknaha VDC; 3, 4, and 5 were made from Manpur; number 6 was made from Basbitta, and number 9 was made from Thangi VDC. Siraha is also a headquarter of Siraha district. It is around 20 KM south from Mahendra Highway.

Merged VDC
The Siraha municipality is composed of total 22 wards, including Laxminya, Sanhaitha, Lagdigadiyani, Lagdigoth, Hakpara. All these were villages Development Committee consisting of 9 wards in each VDC, and all were merged to Siraha municipality making total 22 wards. Its area is 94.20 km2 and population as of 2015 was 82,531. Its headquarters is the old Siraha municipality office. Its neighbours to the north are Bishnupur and Arnama Gaupalika, to the south is Bihar (India) to the west is Dhanusha District, and to the east are Aurhi and Arnama Gaupalika. The population consists of Hindus, Muslims, and Buddhists, and the main languages are Nepali, Maithali, Hindi, and Urdu.

Educational institutes

 Surya Narayan Satya Narayan Morbaita Yadav Bahumukhi Campus Siraha
 Shree Chandra Higher Secondary School
 Mount Everest secondary school
 Evergreen Academy Siraha
 Balsansar English Boarding School
 Everest English Boarding School
 Shree Kanya Primary School
 Pentagon Academy
 Kinder Garten English School 
 Sarswar Nath higher secondary school, Sarswar
 Nepal Avalanche Academy, Ramaul
 Secondary School, Ramaul
EASTERN STAR ENGLISH BOARDING SCHOOL,KHIRAUNA
 Sagarmatha higher secondary school, Mirchiya
 Siddhartha sissu niketan ma vi. school. (near shiv chock)
 Morning pearl secondary school
 Moon light secondary school
 Aeron hill secondary school
 purbaaanchal Secondary school
 Shree Janta Secondary School, Brahampuri
 Shree Aadharbhut Bidyalaya, Lattatol
 Galaxy public school siraha madar 16
Ambition academy

Infrastructure
Rajbiraj Airport is the nearest airport to the district, roughly 50–58 km away from various locations. Shree Airlines operates daily flights between Rajbiraj and Kathmandu

Nearby towns Laukaha in India and Thadi in Nepal are a part of one of the agreed route for Mutual Trade between India and Nepal. Nepal Government of Nepal has set up a dedicated customs office in the town. and Government of India has set up a Land Customs Station with a Superintendent level officer.

Nearby town is Lahan, Nepal where there is a popular Eye Hospital by name of Sagarmatha Choudhary Eye Hospital, Lahan.

Transportation

The district through its border town Thadi town is also connected to Laukaha Bazar railway station which is located in adjacent Indian town of Laukaha.

Laukaha is well connected to NH 57 via khutauna to phulparas. Aprrox distance from laukaha to phulparas is 30 km.

Notable People
Notable people from Siraha include Dr. Ram Ray, an Associate Professor and Researcher, who has made hundreds of publications and has made contributions to knowledge about landslide hazards.

Media
 Siraha City Facebook.com/Sirahacity
 Salhesh Times Facebook.com/salheshtimes
 Apan Dainik Facebook.com/Apandainik

References

External links
UN map of the municipalities of  Siraha District

Siraha District
Transit and customs posts along the India–Nepal border
Populated places in Mithila, Nepal
Municipalities in Madhesh Province
Populated places in Siraha District
Nepal municipalities established in 1997